The Autopista AP-71 (also known as Autopista León - Astorga) is an autopista in the province of León, in the community of Castile and León, Spain. It is 37.5 km (23.3 miles) long and runs, parallel to the N-120 road, from the junction of the Autovía A-66/Autopista AP-66 and the Autovía LE-30 near the city of León to the Autovía A-6 at the town of Astorga. It opened in October 2002 as the A-12, being redesignated the AP-71 the following year.

External links
Autopista AP-71 Concessionaire

Autopistas and autovías in Spain
Transport in Castile and León